Screaming Blue Murder: Dedicated to Phil Lynott is a live album released by the English hard rock band, Blue Murder. It is the band's third and final release, and was initially issued only in Japan. It has since been re-released internationally via iTunes.

Track listing
All tracks written by John Sykes, except where indicated.
 
 "Riot" - 7:16
 "Cry for Love" - 7:53
 "Cold Sweat" (Sykes, Phil Lynott) - 3:26
 "Billy" - 6:45
 "Save My Love" - 3:36
 "Jelly Roll" - 4:51
 "We All Fall Down" - 5:24
 "Please Don't Leave Me" (Lynott, Sykes) - 7:27
 "Still of the Night" (David Coverdale, Sykes) - 8:48
 "Dancing in the Moonlight (It's Caught Me in Its Spotlight)" (Lynott) - 4:39

Personnel
John Sykes - lead vocals, guitar
Marco Mendoza - bass, backing vocals
Tommy O'Steen - drums
Nik Green - keyboards

References

Blue Murder (band) albums
1994 live albums
Geffen Records live albums
Albums produced by John Sykes